Dariusz Karol Bachura, styling himself Karol Bachura (born 4 June 1964, in Warsaw) is a Polish diplomat with the rank of Ambassador-at-large, specialist in the region of Southeastern Europe; an ambassador to Macedonia (2007–2011) and Albania (2016–2021).

Life 
Karol Bachura graduated from English philology and pedagogical studies at the Eötvös Loránd University, Hungary. He has studied in the United States and United Kingdom, as well.

He has been working for the Office for Democratic Institutions and Human Rights in Warsaw, Phare programme, consulate of Canada in Warsaw. In 1993, Bachura joined the Ministry of Foreign Affairs of Poland. For three years, he was working as an expert in the Central Europe Unit. Between 1996 and 1998, he was First Secretary at the embassy in Ljubljana. Next, he was deputy chief of mission in Budapest (1998) and Zagreb (1999–2001). For the next six years, he worked at the MFA headquarter in Warsaw as a specialist at the Export Policy Department and First Counsellor at the Security Policy Department. From 12 December 2007 to 15 August 2011, he served as an ambassador to Macedonia. Between September 2011 and September 2013, with the mandate of the UN Security Council, he headed the Banja Luka Regional Office of the High Representative for Bosnia and Herzegovina. Afterwards, from 2013 to 2016, he was back in Warsaw, at the MFA Eastern Department. In August 2016, he was appointed Poland ambassador to Albania. He ended his term on 31 January 2021.

Bachura is married to Małgorzata Bachura. Besides Polish, he speaks fluently English and Hungarian. He has also communicative knowledge of French, German, Serbo-Croatian and Macedonian languages.

References 

1964 births
Ambassadors of Poland to Albania
Ambassadors of Poland to North Macedonia
Living people
Diplomats from Warsaw
Polish officials of the United Nations
Budapest University alumni